The 1969 mass uprising in East Pakistan was a democratic political movement in East Pakistan (now Bangladesh). The uprising consisted of a series of mass demonstrations and sporadic conflicts between government armed forces and the demonstrators. Although the unrest began in 1966 with the Six point movement of Awami League, it got momentum at the beginning of 1969 and culminated in the resignation of Field Marshal Ayub Khan, the first military ruler of Pakistan. The uprising also led to the withdrawal of the Agartala Conspiracy Case and acquittal of Sheikh Mujibur Rahman and his colleagues.

Timeline of events in 1969
 4 January: Shorbodolio Chatro Shongram Porishad (The All Party Student Action Committee) puts forth its 11-point agenda.
 7–8 January: Formation of a political coalition named Democratic Action Committee (DAC) to restore democracy.
 20 January: Student activist Amanullah Asaduzzaman dies as the police opens fire on the demonstrators.

 24 January: Matiur Rahman Mallik, a teenager activist, is gunned down by the police.
 15 February: Sergeant Zahurul Haq, one of the convicts of Agartala Conspiracy Case, is assassinated in the prison of Kurmitola Cantonment.
 18 February: Shamsuzzoha of the University of Rajshahi is killed as the police open fire on a silent procession in Rajshahi.
 22 February: Withdrawal of Agartala Conspiracy Case. Sheikh Mujibur Rahman, leader of the All-Pakistan Awami League, released from his prison cell in the Dhaka cantonment.
 23 February: Sheikh Mujibur Rahman is accorded a grand reception, where he is given the title Bangabandhu (friend of Bengal).
 10–13 March: Ayub Khan calls for a round-table meeting with the opposition.
 25 March: Ayub Khan hands over power to General Yahya Khan, the army Chief of Staff.

References

History of East Pakistan
Causes and prelude of the Bangladesh Liberation War
1969 in East Pakistan
1969 in Pakistan
Conflicts in 1969
Student protests in Pakistan
Social movements in Pakistan